The Women's 48 kg competition at the 2021 World Judo Championships was held on 6 June 2021.

Results

Finals

Repechage

Pool A

Pool B

Pool C

Pool D

Prize money
The sums listed bring the total prizes awarded to 57,000€ for the individual event.

References

External links
 
 Draw

W48
World Judo Championships Women's Extra Lightweight
World W48